Victor Cornelius   (22 September 1897 in Copenhagen, Denmark – 9 May 1961) was a Danish composer, pianist, and singer.

He is best known for his songs Toner fra himlen, Tre røde roser, Lille kammerat, Tak for gode som for onde år, I en sal på hospitalet and Mor er den bedste i verden. Cornelius also sung the first Danish-language version of "When You Wish Upon a Star" in the 1940 version of Pinocchio.

Cornelius also composed for a number of films including:

Alle går rundt og forelsker sig
Med fuld musik
Snushanerne

References

This article was initially translated from the Danish Wikipedia.

20th-century Danish composers
Danish film score composers
1897 births
1961 deaths
Danish pianists
20th-century pianists
Male pianists
Male film score composers
20th-century Danish male musicians